Ida Di Benedetto (born 3 June 1945) is an Italian actress and film producer.

Biography
Di Benedetto appeared in more than 50 films and television shows between 1974 and 2004. She starred in the film The Whores, which was entered into the 1994 Cannes Film Festival. She won the Nastro d'Argento (Silver Ribbon) for Best Supporting Actress in 1981 for her supporting role as Maria Rosa in Fontamara from the same name novel by Ignazio Silone and the following year she won the Nastro d'Argento for Best Actress for Immacolata e Concetta.

Selected filmography

Producer 
 The Fine Art of Love, directed by John Irvin (2006)

Cinema actress 

 Il gioco della verità, directed by Michele Massa (1974)
 ...a tutte le auto della polizia, directed by Mario Caiano (1975)
 Fontamara, directed by Carlo Lizzani (1977)
 , directed by Werner Schroeter (1978)
 Immacolata e Concetta, directed by Salvatore Piscicelli (1980)
 Palermo or Wolfsburg, directed di Werner Schroeter (1980)
 Camera d'albergo, directed by Mario Monicelli (1981)
 Day of the Idiots, directed by Werner Schroeter (1981)
 Testa o croce, directed by Nanni Loy (1982)
 Più bello di così si muore, directed by Pasquale Festa Campanile (1982)
 Tradimento, directed by Alfonso Brescia (1982)
 Giuramento, directed by Alfonso Brescia (1982)
 Sleep of Reason, directed by Ula Stöckl (1984)
 The Incinerator, directed by Pier Francesco Boscaro dagli Ambrosi, (1984)
 Giuseppe Fava: Siciliano come me, directed by Vittorio Sindoni (1984)
 Noi tre, directed by Pupi Avati (1984)
 Guapparia, directed by Stelvio Massi (1984)
 Pizza Connection, directed by Damiano Damiani (1985)
 Mamma Ebe, directed by Carlo Lizzani (1985)
 La ballata di Eva, directed by Francesco Longo (1985)
 Blues metropolitano, directed by Salvatore Piscicelli (1985)
 Champagne amer, directed by Ridha Behi (1986)
 Regina, directed by Salvatore Piscicelli (1987)
 Ferdinando, Man of Love, directed by Memè Perlini (1990)
 Marcellino pane e vino, directed by Luigi Comencini (1991)
 The Whores, directed by Aurelio Grimaldi (1994)
 Oltremare - Non è l'America, directed by Nello Correale (1998)
 Quartetto, directed by Salvatore Piscicelli (2001)
 Rosa Funzeca, directed by Aurelio Grimaldi (2002)
 Alla fine della notte, directed by Salvatore Piscicelli (2003)
 Fratella e sorello, directed by Sergio Citti (2005)
 Leone nel basilico, directed by Leone Pompucci (2013)

Television actress 

 Il marsigliese (1975)
 Storie della camorra, directed by Paolo Gazzara (1978)
 L'altro Simenon (1979)
 La mano sugli occhi (1979)
 L'eredità della priora, directed by Anton Giulio Majano (1980)
 L'indizio (1982)
 L'amante dell'Orsa Maggiore, directed by Anton Giulio Majano (1983)
 Sogni e bisogni, directed by Sergio Citti (1985)
 Un'isola, directed by Carlo Lizzani (1986)
 Losberg (1986)
 L'isola del tresoro, directed by Antonio Margheriti (1987)
 Quando ancora non c'erano i Beatles (1988)
 Mit den Clowns kamen die Tränen (1990)
 Morte a contratto, directed by Gianni Lepre (1993)
 Gioco perverso, directed by Italo Moscati (1993)
 Alles Glück dieser Erde (1994)
 L'ispettore Sarti (1994)
 Morte di una strega, directed by Cinzia TH Torrini (1995)
 I ragazzi del muretto, directed by Gianluigi Calderone (1996)
 Un posto al sole (1996-1998, 2000)
 Il bello delle donne, directed by Lidia Montanari, Luigi Parisi, Maurizio Ponzi e Giovanni Soldati (2002)
 Chiaroscuro, directed by Tomaso Sherman (2003)
 Madre come te, directed by Vittorio Sindoni (2004)
 Mannaggia alla miseria, directed by Lina Wertmüller (2010)
 Paura di amare, directed by Vincenzo Terracciano (2010)
 Paura di amare 2, directed by Vincenzo Terracciano (2013)

References

External links

1945 births
Living people
Italian film actresses
Italian film producers
Nastro d'Argento winners
20th-century Italian actresses
21st-century Italian actresses
Film people from Naples
Actresses from Naples